William Shaw is an American chemist and the founder of the Great Plains Laboratory, based in Lenexa, Kansas. Great Plains Laboratory is listed as "performing nonstandard laboratory tests" by Quackwatch.

Education
Shaw has a bachelor's degree in biochemistry from the University of Georgia (1967) and a PhD from the Medical University of South Carolina (1971), also in biochemistry.

Career
After obtaining his PhD, Shaw spent six years working at the Centers for Disease Control and Prevention, where he was a supervisory research chemist and the chief of the radioimmunoassay laboratory. He then worked at Mercer University in Atlanta for a year as an assistant professor of pharmacy, before beginning a twelve-year stint at Smith Kline Beecham Clinical Laboratories, also in Atlanta. From 1991 until 1996, he worked at Children's Mercy Hospital in Kansas City, Missouri.

Autism
William Shaw became focused on autism in 1993, and has claimed that acetaminophen may be a major cause of autism,. Nevertheless, as of 2017, there still was no good evidence to claim that acetaminophen caused autism. Shaw has also alleged without credible scientific evidence that yeast infections cause autism. He was accused of "exploit[ing] the parents' understandable and desperate search for a cause of their children's autism." Shaw has endorsed dangerous and discredited chelation treatments for autism.

Great Plains Laboratory
William Shaw's laboratory is known for performing nonstandard tests which have been used by alternative medicine practitioners to support discredited diagnoses. Harriet Hall cited Great Plains for "pseudoscientific scaremongering" over glyphosate and selling unwarranted glyphosate testing. Despite no evidence that glyphosate harms humans, Great Plains asserted that glyphosate causes over a dozen conditions, including cancer, autism, psychiatric disorders, heart disease, and neurological disorders. Great Plains has also sold discredited tests for “IgG Food Allergy with Candida” and “vaccine injury.” Additionally, Great Plains Laboratory's urine mycotoxin test is not validated nor recommended for diagnosing any condition.

References

External links
 Great Plains Laboratory

21st-century American chemists
Living people
Medical University of South Carolina alumni
University of Georgia alumni
People from Lenexa, Kansas
Year of birth missing (living people)